Central Luzon, designated as Region III, is an administrative region in the Philippines, primarily serving to organize the 7 provinces of the vast central plains of the island of Luzon (the largest island), for administrative convenience. The region contains the largest plain in the country and produces most of the country's rice supply, earning itself the nickname "Rice Granary of the Philippines". Its provinces are: Aurora, Bataan, Bulacan, Nueva Ecija, Pampanga, Tarlac and Zambales. Pangasinan was formerly a province of Central Luzon before President Marcos signed Presidential Decree No. 1, 1972, incorporating it into Ilocos Region.  Additionally, the province of Aurora  was part of the defunct political region Southern Tagalog when the region was divided into Calabarzon and Mimaropa, upon the issuance of Executive Order No. 103, dated May 17, 2002, by then-President Gloria Macapagal Arroyo, which transferred Aurora to Central Luzon.

Etymology
The current name of the region refers to its position on the island of Luzon. The term was coined by American colonialists after the defeat of the First Philippine Republic. There have been proposals to rename the current Central Luzon region into the Luzones region. The proposed name is in reference to the old name of Luzon island, Luções, which was later used to refer to the central area of the island, stretching from Pagasinan in the north, all the way to Pampanga in the south. The term Luções literally translates into Luzones.

History

In 2002, Central Luzon had the highest unemployment rate among all regions in the country at 11.3%.

Geography 
The region is located north of Manila, the nation's capital. Central Luzon, in addition to the neighboring province of Pangasinan, contains the largest plain in the Philippines with its agricultural plains accounting for about 40% of the geographical region's area.  Bordering it are the regions of Ilocos and Cagayan Valley to the north; National Capital Region, Calabarzon and the waters of Manila Bay to the south; South China Sea to the west; and the Philippine Sea to the east. Pangasinan is historico-culturally and geographically an integral part of this region, but was politically made part of the Ilocos Region by President Ferdinand Marcos on June 22, 1973.

There are fifteen cities in the region: Balanga in Bataan; Baliwag, Malolos, Meycauayan, and San Jose del Monte in Bulacan; Cabanatuan, Gapan, Muñoz, Palayan, and San Jose in Nueva Ecija; Angeles City, Mabalacat, and San Fernando in Pampanga; Tarlac City in Tarlac; and Olongapo in Zambales. Central Luzon produces the most rice in the whole country. Excess rice is delivered and imported to other regions of the Philippines.

The city of San Fernando, the provincial capital of Pampanga, is designated as the regional center. Aurora was transferred from Region IV through Executive Order No. 103 in May 2002.

Administrative divisions

Provinces
Central Luzon comprises 7 provinces, 2 highly urbanized cities, 12 component cities, 116 municipalities, 3,102 barangays

Governors and vice governors

Cities

The Central Luzon Region has fifteen cities. San Jose del Monte is the city with the most population while Angeles City is the most densely populated city in the region. Tarlac City is the largest based on land area.

Demographics

Languages
The native languages of Central Luzon are:
Bugkalot, spoken in parts of Nueva Ecija and Aurora.
 Kapampangan, spoken in the entirety of Pampanga and southern Tarlac, as well as southeastern Zambales, northeastern Bataan, western Bulacan, and southwestern Nueva Ecija.
Casiguranin (Kasiguranin), spoken in parts of Aurora.
 Pangasinan, spoken in northern Tarlac, northeastern Zambales, and northwestern Nueva Ecija.
 Tagalog, spoken in Bulacan, Pampanga, Tarlac, Nueva Ecija, Aurora, Bataan, and Zambales. It is the regional lingua franca, mostly as Filipino.
 Ilocano, spoken in northern Nueva Ecija, north Tarlac, and some parts of Zambales and Aurora.
 Sambal, spoken in a majority of Zambales and a few scattered areas in Bataan and Pampanga.

Religion
Eighty percent of the population of Central Luzon is Roman Catholic. Other religions represented are Protestants (including Evangelicals), Islam, Iglesia ni Cristo, and indigenous Philippine folk religions. There are also other denominations such as Jesus Is Lord, Pentecostal Missionary Church of Christ, Ang Dating Daan, Jesus Miracle Crusade, United Methodist Church and others.

Economy

Gallery

See also
 Super regions of the Philippines
 Philippine Revolution

References

External links 

 Central Luzon Local Search 
 North Luzon Super Region: Potentials
 North Luzon Super Region: Projects
 Executive Order No. 103

 
Regions of the Philippines
Luzon